Velestovo is a small village in the municipality of Cetinje, Montenegro.

Demographics
According to the 2003 census it had 25 inhabitants.

According to the 2011 census, its population was 17.

References

Populated places in Cetinje Municipality